Lewisia disepala is a species of flowering plant in the family Montiaceae known by the common name Yosemite lewisia.

Description
Lewisia disepala is a petite perennial herb growing from a thick branching taproot and short caudex unit. It produces a basal rosette of many small leaves no more than 1.5 centimeters long. The leaves are thick, fleshy, hairless, deep shiny green, and club-shaped, knobby, or finger-like, clumped tightly together. The inflorescence has a stem so short that the flowers sit directly on the basal rosette of leaves, or among them. Each flower has 5 to 8 pale to bright pink oval petals and 15 protruding stamens.

Distribution
Lewisia disepala is endemic to the Sierra Nevada of California, where it is known from several sites high in the mountains. It grows in rocky mountain habitat such as talus and open beds of bare gravel.

References

External links
Jepson Manual Treatment - Lewisia disepala
Lewisia disepala - Photo gallery

disepala
Endemic flora of California
Flora of the Sierra Nevada (United States)